Anders Refn (born 8 April 1944) is a Danish film editor and director.

Biography 
Refn graduated from the National Film School of Denmark in 1969. He has credits for 72 features and TV series, as well as a 10 shorts and 26 documentaries. Refn has often worked as assistant director and technical director, and worked with Lars von Trier as editor of Breaking the Waves (1996) and Antichrist (2009). He was assistant director of Dancer in the Dark (2000), Dogville (2003), Melancholia, and Nymphomaniac (2013).

Refn in 2004 was awarded an Honorary Bodil Award for his overall achievement in Danish film.

Refn is married to cinematographer Vibeke Winding; they are parents of Nicolas Winding Refn, who has also become a director, editor and producer.

Filmography

References

External links 
 
 

1944 births
Danish film editors
Film directors from Copenhagen
Living people
Bodil Honorary Award recipients